Psalm 99 is 99th psalm in the biblical Book of Psalms, the last of the set of additional Royal Psalms, Psalms 93-99, praising God as the King of His people. In the slightly different numbering system of the Greek Septuagint version of the bible and the Latin Vulgate, this psalm is Psalm 98. There is no title in the Masoretic text version, but the Septuagint provides a title: "A psalm of David".

Text

Hebrew Bible version
Following is the Hebrew text of Psalm 99:

King James Version

The following is the full English text of the Psalm from the King James Bible.
 The LORD reigneth; let the people tremble: he sitteth between the cherubims; let the earth be moved.
 The LORD is great in Zion; and he is high above all the people.
 Let them praise thy great and terrible name; for it is holy.
 The king's strength also loveth judgment; thou dost establish equity, thou executest judgment and righteousness in Jacob.
 Exalt ye the LORD our God, and worship at his footstool; for he is holy.
 Moses and Aaron among his priests, and Samuel among them that call upon his name; they called upon the LORD, and he answered them.
 He spake unto them in the cloudy pillar: they kept his testimonies, and the ordinance that he gave them.
 Thou answeredst them, O LORD our God: thou wast a God that forgavest them, though thou tookest vengeance of their inventions.
 Exalt the LORD our God, and worship at his holy hill; for the LORD our God is holy.

Commentary
This psalm is the last of the "enthronement psalms" (Psalm 47; 93; 96–99). It begins with the familiar statement, 'YHWH is king', followed by references to justice and righteousness (verse 4), the covenant with its moral demands (verses 4,7), centering upon Zion (verse 2; cf. 'his holy mountain', verse 9).

Some similarities with Deutero-Isaiah include the call for nations to tremble before God (verse 1). It is unique in naming Moses, Aaron, and Samuel, the "three great intercessors" (cf. , ; ; ;) and featuring the threefold 'Holy' (verses 3, 5, 9).

Alexander Kirkpatrick links this and other royal psalms to the restoration of Israel following the return from Babylon.

Verse 5
Exalt the Lord our God,And worship at His footstool —
He is holy.
"God's footstool" may allude to 'the ark' (where David says, I had it in my heart to build a house of rest for the ark of the covenant of the Lord, and for the footstool of our God), 'the temple, Jerusalem', or 'the whole earth'. Alexander Kirkpatrick notes that "as there was no Ark in the Second Temple, the Temple itself must be meant here, or possibly Zion".

Uses

Judaism
The psalm is recited in its entirety as the fifth paragraph of Kabbalat Shabbat in Ashkenazic, Hasidic and some Sephardic communities.
Verses 5 and 9 are recited in succession during the early part of Pesukei Dezimra. These verses are also recited by the congregation when the Torah scroll is taken out of the ark.
Verse 6 is found in the Foundation of Repentance recited by some on the eve of Rosh Hashanah.
 According to Siddur Avodas Yisrael, Psalm 99 should be read as an additional "Psalm of the Day" on Sabbath Parshat Shemot.

Songs
The following songs are based on Psalm 99 or contain part of the Psalm:
 He sits enthroned – Sons of Korah
 Holy Is He – Jason Silver

References

External links 

 in Hebrew and English – Mechon-mamre
 King James Bible – Wikisource
Recording of the second half of the psalm as sung during Kabbalat Shabbat
Recording of the last verse of the song, as sung by the congregation when the Torah scroll is taken out of the Ark
Recording of Psalm 99 by Jason Silver on jasonsilver.com

099